The name Judy has been used for seventeen tropical cyclones worldwide: thirteen in the Western Pacific Ocean, three in the South Pacific Ocean, and one in the South-West Indian Ocean.

In the Western Pacific:
 Typhoon Judy (1953), skirted the Philippines and Taiwan, then struck Kyushu, Japan
 Typhoon Judy (1957), passed eastern Japan, well offshore
 Typhoon Judy (1960), churned in the open ocean
 Typhoon Judy (1963), remained out at sea
 Typhoon Judy (1966) (Deling), affected primarily Taiwan
 Typhoon Judy (1968), (Paring), remained over the open ocean
 Tropical Storm Judy (1971), meandered off the coast of East Malaysia
 Tropical Storm Judy (1974), (Kading), formed in the South China Sea
 Typhoon Judy (1978), did not impact land
 Typhoon Judy (1979), (Neneng), struck China and South Korea
 Typhoon Judy (1982), (Susang), hit southeastern Japan
 Typhoon Judy (1986), (T8601, 01W, Akang), drifted east of the Philippines, never made landfall
 Typhoon Judy (1989), made landfall on Kyushu, Japan, and in South Korea

In the South Pacific:
 Cyclone Judy (1989), stayed at sea.
 Cyclone Judy (2004), remained over the open ocean 
 Cyclone Judy (2023), made landfall in Vanuatu

In the South-West Indian:
 Tropical Depression Judy (1965), east of Madagascar

Pacific typhoon set index articles
South Pacific cyclone set index articles
South-West Indian Ocean cyclone set index articles